Cloncurry is a rural town and locality in the Shire of Cloncurry, Queensland, Australia. In the  the locality of Cloncurry had a population of 3,167 people.

Cloncurry is the administrative centre of the Shire of Cloncurry.

Cloncurry is known as the Friendly Heart of the Great North West and celebrated its 150th anniversary in 2017.

Cloncurry was recognised for its liveability, winning the Queensland's Friendliest Town award twice by environmental movement Keep Queensland Beautiful, first in 2013 and again in 2018.

Geography 
Cloncurry is situated in the north-west of Queensland, 770 kilometres west of the city of Townsville via the Flinders Highway. The town lies adjacent to the Cloncurry River.
Cattle grazing is the significant industry in the region, and a large sale yards is located in the town.

Road infrastructure
The Flinders Highway enters from the east and the Barkly Highway exits to the west. The Landsborough Highway enters from the south-east and the Burke Developmental Road exits to the north.
The Cloncurry–Dajarra Road exits to the south from the Barkly Highway.

History
Kalkatunga (also known as Kalkadoon, Kalkadunga, Kalkatungu) is an Australian Aboriginal language. The Kalkatunga language region is North-West Queensland including the local government areas of the City of Mount Isa.

The first Europeans to traverse these tribal lands of peoples such as the Maithakari and the Wanamara, were Burke and Wills on their epic, and ultimately fatal, transcontinental expedition. The Cloncurry River was named by Burke after Lady Elizabeth Cloncurry, his cousin, with the town eventually taking its name from the river.

Ernest Henry discovered copper in the area in 1867,  and the town sprang up to service the Great Australia Mine to the south. Roger Sheaffe established the first pastoral run in the Cloncurry district - "Fort Constantine".  Gold was discovered at Top Camp. 

The town was surveyed in 1876. Cloncurry was proclaimed a town in 1884.

Cloncurry Provisional School opened on 19 March 1884. In 1894 it became Cloncurry State School.

The Cloncurry Advocate was a newspaper published in Cloncurry between 1889 and 1953.

Queensland's Northern Line railway reached Cloncurry in December 1907 and was officially opened the next year.

St Joseph's School opened on 29 October 1909 by the Sisters of St Joseph of the Sacred Heart.

In 1914 a fire broke out in the town resulting in the destruction of the Post Office, the hotel, eleven shops, two store-rooms and a cottage. The telegraph office was saved by employees who kept the office damp and protected with wet blankets. One man died in the blaze which cost an estimated £15,000.

From 1915 to 1931 the Australian Inland Mission (part of the Presbyterian Church) operated its North West Patrol in Cloncurry which provided religious services to people in remote areas by driving through the Outback; the service later operated from Mount Isa. A similar service, the Federal Methodist Inland Mission Patrol commenced  was established in 1928 at its Gulf Mission Base in Camooweal. The amalgamation of the Presbyterian, Methodist and Congregational churches in 1977 to form the Uniting Church in Australia intended to combine these outback services, creating a huge North West Patrol area to be covered which could not be achieved by road transport, so the Cloncurry congregation purchased an aircraft in 1976 to provide the patrol service out of Cloncurry by air wherever possible, using road travel only to access places that did not have suitable airstrips. In the early 1990s the service was renamed the McKay Patrol to honour Reverend Fred McKay, an early patrol padre who had been involved in establishing the Royal Flying Doctor Service.

During World War II, Cloncurry was the location of RAAF No.23 Inland Aircraft Fuel Depot (IAFD), completed in 1942 and closed on 14 August 1944. Usually consisting of 4 tanks, 31 fuel depots were built across Australia for the storage and supply of aircraft fuel for the RAAF and the US Army Air Forces at a total cost of £900,000 ($1,800,000).

The discovery of uranium at Mary Kathleen brought wealth to the community in the 1950s. Until the development of Mount Isa in the 1960s, Cloncurry was the administrative centre of the region.

The first-ever flight of the Royal Flying Doctor Service of Australia took place from Cloncurry on 15 May 1928, using a de Havilland DH.50 aircraft hired from the then small airline, Qantas. A Royal Flying Doctor Service museum is situated in the town.

The population in Cloncurry decreased from 3,898 in 1996 to 2,900 in 2002. It declined further to 2,719 by 2016.

The Cloncurry Bob McDonald Library opened in 2012.

It was announced on 11 February 2021 that Cloncurry had been chosen as the production location of the 2021 edition of Network 10's reality game show Australian Survivor. The domestic location resulted from concerns regarding international travel during the COVID-19 pandemic. It was filmed in Cloncurry from 22 April to 8 June 2021, with the season airing on 18 July 2021.

Heritage listings
Cloncurry has a number of heritage-listed sites, including:
 Via Sheaffe Street: Mount Elliott Company Metallurgical Plant and Mill
 42-48 Daintree Street: Cloncurry Courthouse
 47 Scarr Street: Cloncurry Post Office

Education 
Cloncurry State School is a government primary and secondary (Prep-12) school for boys and girls at Daintree Street. In 2015 the school had 281 students enrolled with a teaching staff of 28 FTE (Full-time equivalent) and 15 FTE (Full-time equivalent) non teaching staff. The general population in the community is highly transient with approximately 40% turnover in student enrolment in 2015. Approximately 60% of student enrolment identify as Aboriginal and or Torres Strait Islander. In 2018, the school had an enrolment of 277 students with 32 teachers and 18 non-teaching staff (14 full-time equivalent). It includes a special education program.

St Joseph's Catholic School is a Catholic primary and secondary (Prep-9) school for boys and girls at Sheaffe Street. In 2018, the school had an enrolment of 156 students with 20 teachers (18 full-time equivalent) and 11 non-teaching staff (5 full-time equivalent).

Amenities 
Cloncurry has a public library, gallery, public swimming pool, showground, and racecourse.

The Cloncurry Shire Council operates a public library in Cloncurry at Scarr Street.

The Cloncurry branch of the Queensland Country Women's Association has its rooms at Charlotte Scott House in Scarr Street. Charlotte Scott was a dedicated member of the Cloncurry QCWA who died in 1992 having spent most of her life in Cloncurry. She was well known for her dancing, especially the Charleston.

Cloncurry Uniting Church is at 19 Meldrum Street (corner of King Street). The church operates the McKay Patrol, an aerial service of the Uniting Church in Australia. The patrol also provides regular church services in the towns of Cloncurry, Julia Creek, McKinlay, and Karumba and at Adels Grove homestead.

Attractions 
Attractions in Cloncurry include:

 Flying Doctor museum and a mineral display in the old post office.

Notable residents
Writer Alexis Wright grew up in Cloncurry.

Association Footballer Kasey Wehrman was born in Cloncurry (16 August 1977). He went on to play domestically and in Scandinavia. His achievements include winning a NSL Championship in 1996–1997 with the Brisbane Strikers and being capped several times with the Australian National Team.

Politician Bob Katter was born in Cloncurry in 1945.

Athlete Robert Crowther was born in Cloncurry (2 August 1987). He went on to win the 2006 World Junior Championships in Beijing, China with a jump of 8.00m, the 2007 World Uni Games in Bangkok with a jump of 8.02m, and was the 2008 Australian long jump champion at the 2008 Australian Athletics Championships held in Brisbane. He represented Australia at the 2011 World Championships in Daegu, South Korea.  He missed out on 2 Olympics due to injury.

Climate 
 
Cloncurry has a hot semi-arid climate (Köppen: BSh Trewartha: BShb) with two distinct seasons. There is a very hot, moderately humid and quite uncomfortable wet season from December to March and a warm to hot, generally rainless dry season usually extending from April to November. Recent investigations have revealed that this temperature was measured in an improvised screen made from a beer crate and that it equated to 47–49 °C under standard conditions.

Because of the area's extreme solar conditions, Cloncurry was expected to become Australia's first solar-powered town. However the planned 10MW Thermal solar plant was scrapped due to light pollution concerns and a 2.128MW flat panel photovoltaic solar farm was to be built in its place. However, the Queensland Government withdrew financial support for the solar farm in May 2012.

Transport
Cloncurry has linkages to other destinations via major coach operators such as Greyhound and Bus Queensland. A weekday service to Mount Isa is operated by Cloncurry Coaches as well as local charter services within the area for mining, school, sporting bodies and special events.
See Cloncurry Airport

See also

References

External links

 University of Queensland: Queensland Places: Cloncurry
 Town map of Cloncurry, 1983

 
Towns in Queensland
Shire of Cloncurry
Localities in Queensland